

Births 
 January 1 - Götz Briefs (died 1974)
 February 8 - Fritz Heinemann (died 1970)
 February 22 - R. G. Collingwood (died 1943)
 March 1 - Tetsuro Watsuji (died 1960)
 April 14 - Arnold J. Toynbee (died 1975)
 April 26 - Ludwig Wittgenstein (died 1951)
 June 1 - Charles Kay Ogden (died 1957)
 July 26 - Tadeusz Czeżowski (died 1981)
 September 4 - Moses Schönfinkel (died 1942)
 September 5 - Oskar Becker (died 1964)
 September 26 - Martin Heidegger (died 1976)
 October 12 - Erich Przywara (died 1972)
 October 12 - Dietrich von Hildebrand (died 1977)
 December 4 - Xavier Zubiri (died 1983)
 December 7 - Gabriel Marcel (died 1973)

Deaths 
 October 17 - Nikolay Chernyshevsky (born 1828)
 December 23 - Constance Naden (born 1858)

Philosophy
19th-century philosophy
Philosophy by year